Dzmitry Makar (born 1 October 1981) is a Belarusian professional football coach and former player who workes as a coach at Isloch Minsk Raion.

Career
Born in Minsk, Makar began playing football in FC Smena Minsk's youth system. He joined city rivals FC Zvezda-VA-BGU Minsk and made his Belarusian Premier League debut in 2002. Makar would join FC Shakhtyor Soligorsk where he was part of the squad that won the 2005 Premier League.

On 20 February 2018, the BFF banned him from football for 24 months for his involvement in the match-fixing.

Honours
Shakhtyor Soligorsk
Belarusian Premier League champion: 2005

References

External links

1981 births
Living people
Belarusian footballers
Association football midfielders
FC Darida Minsk Raion players
FC Energetik-BGU Minsk players
FC Torpedo Minsk players
FC Shakhtyor Soligorsk players
FC Neman Grodno players
FC Minsk players
FC Dynamo Brest players
FC Gorodeya players
FC Rechitsa-2014 players
FC Isloch Minsk Raion players